Belkacem Remache (born October 12, 1985 in Constantine) is an Algerian football player who is currently playing as a defender for AS Khroub in the Algerian Ligue Professionnelle 2.

Club career
On July 12, 2010, Remache signed a one-year contract with JS Kabylie.

International career
On April 5, 2008, Remache was called up by the Algerian A' National Team for a game against USM Blida on April 11. He has also been capped at the Under-23 level.

On May 25, 2012, Remache was called up by Vahid Halilhodžić to the Algeria National Team for the first time, after a number of injuries to the players in camp.

References

Honours
 Won the Algerian Cup once with JS Kabylie in 2010–11 Algerian Cup

External links
 
 

1985 births
Algerian footballers
Living people
JS Kabylie players
Footballers from Constantine, Algeria
Algerian Ligue Professionnelle 1 players
USM Annaba players
AS Khroub players
Algeria under-23 international footballers
Association football defenders
21st-century Algerian people